Yokota High School (YHS) is a high school located on Yokota Air Base, Japan. It is part of the Department of Defense Education Activity.

It is in the Yokota AFB South area, and in the municipality of Fussa.

History 
Yokota High School started construction in the 1970s after a deal was struck with the Government of Japan to modernize Yokota Air Base in exchange for Air Force property in Greater Tokyo. Yokota High School officially opened in 1973. The school was designed as a "school with open doors" and students had a modular schedule containing 27 mods that they could choose from. The modular schedule continued under the next 2 principals.

Renovations 
The school has gone through some renovations, including an artificial turf field, with both football and soccer lines and a surrounding track, which was built in 2012 at a cost of $1.2 million.

New school 
Starting in 2015 a new school was planned and the breaking ground ceremony took place on May 19, 2015; officially starting the construction period for the new school. The new school was built and completed in August 2017. Most of the old building has been torn down to make way for a soccer field and open land that will be given back to the Air Force. The new building is a 21st-century school and is the second 21st-century school in DoDEA. Each classroom has movable glass walls that are built to reflect the new method of learning which values collaboration.

Extracurricular activities 
Yokota High School offers a great amount of extracurricular activities for Academics or Sports for students to participate in. Most also have Far East Programs.

Academics 

 Air Force JROTC
Analogue Game Club
 Art Club
 Band
 Chorus
 Debate
 Drama
 Model United Nations
 National Honor Society
 FE Creative Expression
 FE Film & Entertainment
 FE Journalism
 FE LinguaFest
 FE Music
 FE STEM
Garage Band
 Student Government Association
 Spanish Club
 Yearbook
Poetry Club

Sports

Fall sports 

 Cheerleading
 Cross Country
 Football
 Tennis
 Volleyball

Winter sports 

 Basketball (Boys/Girls)
 Cheerleading
 Wrestling

Spring sports 

 Baseball
 Softball
 Boys soccer
 Girls soccer
 Track and field

See also
 List of high schools in Tokyo

References

High schools in Tokyo
Department of Defense Education Activity